Mykola Hlushchenko (17 September 1901 – 31 October 1977) was a Ukrainian artist. He was a winner of the Shevchenko National Prize in 1972.

Biography 

Hlushchenko was born in Novomoskovske, Yekaterinoslav Governorate, Russian Empire. Novomoskovsk is known for the fact that in the 17th century the site was occupied by several villages of Zaporozhian Cossacks. At the early age Mykola moved to Yuzivka where he attended classes in drawing and became fond by artwork of Illia Ripin and Vasilkivsky. After escaping a prisoner-of-war camp in Poland during World War I he made his way to Germany where his love for art brought him to the private studio of Hans Baluschek in Berlin. Mykola Hlushchenko was noted by critics who reviewed several of his paintings submitted to the Kasper Art Gallery in Berlin in 1924.  

A graduate of the Academy of Art in Berlin (1924), from 1925 he worked in Paris where he immediately attracted the attention of French critics. From the New Objectivity style of his Berlin period he changed to post-Impressionism. Besides numerous French, Italian, Dutch, and (later) Ukrainian landscapes, he also painted flowers, still life, nudes, and portraits (such as of Oleksandr Dovzhenko and Volodymyr Vynnychenko, as well as portraits commissioned by the Soviet government of the French writers Henri Barbusse, Romain Rolland, and Victor Margueritte and the painter Paul Signac). Through his relationship with businessman André Mirabeau, he allegedly obtained over two hundred drawings of military equipment which he supplied to Soviet intelligence.

At the beginning of the 1930s, Hlushchenko belonged to the Association of Independent Ukrainian Artists and helped organize its large exhibition of Ukrainian, French, and Italian paintings at the National Museum in Lviv. In 1936 he moved to the USSR. Working for the Soviet Union secret service, he was among those who warned the Soviet government about the German plan to attack ahead of time. In 1944, he moved to Kyiv, and created a series of paintings of the post-war Kyiv, as well as many landscapes he saw while traveling to France, Belgium, Switzerland, Italy and other countries. 

In the 1960s, having come into close contact with new artistic trends on his trips abroad, he revitalized his paintings with expressive colors, and assumed a leading position among Ukrainian colorist painters. Hlushchenko's work was exhibited in Berlin (1924), Paris (five exhibits 1925–34), Milan (1927), Budapest (1930, 1932), Stockholm (1931), Rome (1933), Lviv (1934, 1935), Moscow (1943, 1959), Belgrade (1966, 1968), London (1966), Toronto (1967–9), and Kyiv (over 10 exhibits). He died in Kyiv, Ukrainian SSR. He was buried at Baikove Cemetery.

Awards 
 Order of the Red Banner of Labour (24.11.1960)
 People's Artist of Ukraine (1944)
 People's Artist of the USSR (1976)
 Shevchenko National Prize (1972) — for a series of paintings "On Lenin's places abroad", "Landscapes of Ukraine" (1969-1971).

References

Bibliography 
 Kovzhun, P.; Hordyns'kyi, S. Mykola Hlushchenko (Lviv 1934)
 Shpakov, A. Mykola Petrovych Hlushchenko (Kyiv 1962)
 Buhaienko, I. Mykola Hlushchenko (Kyiv 1973)
 The catalog of the exhibition of M. Glushchenko's graphics (1930s–1970s) / Kyiv National Museum of Russian Art. Kyiv : Golden Section, 2012. 128 p. 
 Igor Bugaenko. Mykola Hlushchenko: Biographical sketch
 A set of postcards by Mykola Hlushchenko. Kyiv, 1976.
 12 Nudes by Mykola Hlushchenko. Exclusive by Ukrainian Art Library.

1901 births
1977 deaths
20th-century Ukrainian painters
20th-century Ukrainian male artists
People from Novomoskovsk
People from Yekaterinoslav Governorate
People's Artists of the USSR (visual arts)
Recipients of the Order of the Red Banner of Labour
Recipients of the Shevchenko National Prize
Soviet spies
Soviet artists
Ukrainian male painters
Burials at Baikove Cemetery
Ukrainian avant-garde